A Assistant Collector cum Sub Divisional Magistrate (also known as Assistant Commissioner or Sub Divisional Officer) is an union civil service officer of the Indian Administrative Service cadre or  a provincial civil service officer of the  State Administrative Service cadre responsible for land revenue collection, canal revenue collection and law and order maintenance in a particular sub-district , depending on a country's government structure. Additionally, Indian Administrative Service officers selected from UPSC or State Public Services Commission also serve as AC&SDM in their training period. They are also known as Assistant Collector cum Sub Divisional Magistrate or Assistant Commissioner or Sub Divisional Officer (Civil) or Revenue Divisional Officer several Indian states. Each district is divided into revenue sub-districts. It is empowered by Collector cum District Magistrate. All revenue sub divisions or revenue divisions are under the charge of Sub Collector cum Sub Divisional Magistrate.

In India, an assistant collector cum sub divisional magistrate has several  executive magisterial roles to play under Criminal Procedure Code 1973.

Functions

Collection of Land Revenue and Canal Revenue

It involves maintenance of land records, conduct of revenue cases, carrying out of demarcation and mutations, settlement operations and functioning as custodian of public land. They are primarily responsible for day to day revenue management  (land and canal). The subordinate revenue staff consisting of revenue assistants (land & canal) supervised by revenue inspectors (land and canal) who are in turn supervised by  revenue circle officers (land and canal) who are involved in field level revenue activities and mutations. They are also empowered to issue various kinds of statutory certificates including SC/ST and OBC, Domicile, Nationality etc. Registration of Property documents, sale deeds, power of attorneys, share certificates and all other documents which need to be compulsorily registered as per law is made at Sub Registrar's Office which are nine in numbers. Deputy Commissioners are Registrars for their respective districts and exercise supervisory control over the Sub Registrars.

Maintenance of Law and Order
Assistant Collector cum Sub Divisional Magistrates exercise powers of Executive Magistrates. In this role they are responsible for operating preventive Sections of Code of Criminal Procedure. They also carry out enquiries in cases of unnatural deaths of women within seven years of marriage and issue directions to the Police for registration of case, if required.

Sub Divisional Magistrates are empowered to conduct enquiries into custodial deaths including deaths in Police Lock Up, Jails, Women Homes etc. The Officers of this Department are also expected to act as eyes and ears of the Government and conduct enquiries into all major accidents including major fires incidents, riots and natural calamities etc.

Disaster Management

This department is given the primary responsibility for relief and rehabilitation operations in any calamity whether natural or man-made. It is also responsible for coordinating and implementing disaster management plan for natural and chemical disasters and awareness generation programme on disaster preparedness is being carried out with the assistance of United Nations Development

Nomenclature 
The term "Sub Divisional Magistrate" (SDM) is used in some states of India to refer to a government official who is responsible for revenue administration and other related functions at the sub-divisional level. However, the nomenclature and role of SDMs may vary from state to state. Here are some of the different names of SDMs in Indian states:

Assistant Collector - In some states such as Gujarat and Maharashtra, the SDM is known as Assistant Collector.
Assistant Commissioner (AC)- In Karnataka, the SDM is known as Assistant Commissioner cum Sub Divisional Magistrate.
Sub Divisional Officer (SDO) - This is the term used for SDMs in many states such as West Bengal, Bihar, Jharkhand, Assam, Mizoram, Nagaland, etc.
Sub Divisional Magistrate (SDM) - This term is used in states such as Haryana, Punjab, Uttar Pradesh, Rajasthan, Madhya Pradesh, Gujarat and Jammu and Kashmir.
Sub Collector - In some states such as Andhra Pradesh, Odisha, Telangana, Tamil Nadu and Kerala the SDM is referred to as Sub Collector.
Revenue Divisional Officer (RDO)-In some states such as Kerala, Tamilnadu the Sub Collector is also known as Revenue Divisional Officer (RDO).

In Kerala and also Tamilnadu, this post is known as Sub Collector. When IAS officers become the officer-in-charge of a Revenue Division, they are generally called as Sub Collectors. They also have the role and powers of a Sub Divisional Magistrate in the sub-division. However they are generally known as Sub Collector.

When a state cadre or Kerala Administrative Service (KAS) officer is the officer in charge of a revenue division, the same post is also called Revenue Divisional Officer (RDO). RDO has the same function, role and responsibilities as SDM.

In North Eastern States, especially Mizoram this post is known as Sub Divisional Officer (Civil), and also Haryana, West Bengal the post is known as Sub Divisional Officer (SDO). They are also head of a revenue sub division and the sub divisional magistrate.

See also
Administrative division
Table of administrative country subdivisions by country

References

Government occupations
Titles